Mălăiești River may refer to:

 Mălăiești River (Elan)
 Mălăiești River (Sălaș)

See also 
 Mălăiești (disambiguation)